Ronnie Stephen Henry (born 2 January 1984) is an English professional footballer who plays as a defender for Southern League Premier Central club Royston Town. Henry is also a youth academy coach for Stevenage. He is the first player to lift a competitive trophy at the new Wembley Stadium, as captain of Stevenage in May 2007. Henry is Stevenage's all-time record appearance holder.

Henry started his career in the youth system at Tottenham Hotspur. During his time there, he was sent on loan to Southend United until the end of the 2002–03 season. Henry was released by Tottenham in November 2003, and signed for Irish club Dublin City in August 2004. He was released four months later due to financial problems at the club. In January 2005, Henry joined Hertfordshire club Stevenage of the Conference National (fifth tier of the English football league system), initially until the end of the 2004–05 season. He remained at Stevenage and was made captain in 2005. Henry captained the Stevenage team that won the FA Trophy in the first competitive final at Wembley Stadium in May 2007; becoming the first player to lift a competitive trophy at the new stadium. He enjoyed more success at Stevenage in the following years; winning the FA Trophy in 2009, before helping the club earn successive promotions from the Conference Premier into League One.

After seven years at Stevenage, Henry joined Luton Town of the Conference Premier in May 2012, where he was made club captain. In his second season at Luton, Henry was part of the team that won the Conference Premier title. He left Luton that summer, in order to rejoin Stevenage. He spent five further years at Stevenage, during which he became the club's all-time record appearance holder with 502 appearances. Henry left the club in May 2019, returning as an academy coach two months later. Henry signed for Billericay Town of the National League South in June 2019, where he spent two seasons. He signed for seventh tier club Royston Town of the Southern League Premier Central in May 2021. He has also represented the England C team on four occasions between 2006 and 2008.

Early life
Henry was born on 2 January 1984 in Hemel Hempstead, Hertfordshire. He is the grandson of former Tottenham Hotspur defender Ron Henry. He stated that his grandfather was greatly influential to him throughout his career.

Club career

Early career
A product of the Tottenham Hotspur youth system, Henry signed a professional contract with the North London club at the age of 17. He was sent on loan to Southend United on 28 March 2003, on an agreement for the remainder of the 2002–03 season. He made his professional debut for Southend in a 2–0 victory over Darlington at Roots Hall on 5 April 2003, and started two more matches during the loan spell. Henry was released by Tottenham in November 2003, having not made any first-team appearances for the club. Following his departure from Tottenham, Henry had an unsuccessful trial at Luton Town, who were in administration during his time there. Having spent the rest of the 2003–04 season as a free agent, Henry was signed by Irish club Dublin City on a six-month contract in August 2004. He left Dublin City due to financial problems at the club.

Stevenage
Returning to England without a club, Henry signed for Conference National club Stevenage on an initial six-month contract in January 2005. He made his Stevenage debut in a 1–0 away victory at Gravesend & Northfleet in a Conference League Cup match on 25 January 2005. Four days later, on 29 January 2005, he made his league debut for the club in a 3–1 home win over Farnborough Town, playing the full 90 minutes. Henry played regularly under manager Graham Westley for the remainder of the 2004–05 season as Stevenage secured the final Conference National play-off place. He played in all three of the club's Conference National play-off matches, including the 1–0 Conference National play-off final defeat to Carlisle United. Henry remained at Stevenage for the 2005–06 season, making 35 appearances, as the club missed out on a play-off position. During the season, Henry was made captain by Westley in the club's 2–0 victory over Exeter City.

Under the new management of Mark Stimson during the 2006–07 season, Henry played 49 times. Despite losing his captaincy in the early part of the season to Luke Oliver, Henry regained the position as club captain later that season. Henry had started the campaign in a central midfield role, reverting to the role of full-back following Stevenage's poor start to the season. Henry scored his first league goal for Stevenage on 3 April 2007, in a 2–1 home defeat against Kidderminster Harriers. Henry became the first player to lift a trophy at the new Wembley Stadium; after Stevenage beat Kidderminster Harriers 3–2 in the 2007 FA Trophy Final on 12 May 2007. Having been a regular in the starting line-up during the first half of the 2007–08 season under both Mark Stimson and new manager Peter Taylor, Henry was placed on the transfer list after he was unable to agree terms on a new contract in January 2008. Following the re-appointment of Westley as manager, Henry signed a new contract at Stevenage and played regularly at right-back during the 2008–09 season, making 52 appearances. He played in all seven matches in the club's FA Trophy campaign the same season, which included the 2–0 victory against York City in 2009 FA Trophy Final at Wembley Stadium on 9 May 2009.

The following season, Henry continued to be the club's first choice right-back, and he scored his third goal for Stevenage in a 2–0 victory over Eastbourne Borough on 8 September 2009. The season proved to be a successful one both individually and collectively for Henry and Stevenage, playing 48 times, scoring once, as the club earned promotion to the Football League for the first time in the club's history after winning the Conference Premier title. At the Football Conference's Annual Presentation Dinner, Henry was named in the Conference Premier Team of the Year, alongside fellow Stevenage defenders Scott Laird and Mark Roberts. A month into the 2010–11 season, Henry made his 250th appearance for Stevenage in a 0–0 draw at home to Torquay United, the club's first clean sheet of the season. After the match, manager Graham Westley said "he's a stalwart. He's been a tremendous servant for the club over the years. He's helped the club from where it was all the way in to the Football League". Henry played 51 games during the club's first ever season in the Football League, as they earned promotion to League One after winning the 2010–11 League Two play-offs, with Stevenage having the best defensive record in the division.

Henry remained a first-team regular during the 2011–12 season, playing in the club's first ever League One match, a 0–0 draw with Exeter City on 6 August 2011. He went on to make 40 appearances during the campaign, with the Stevenage defence being particularly strong once again. After spending seven years at Stevenage, Henry left the club when his contract expired in May 2012, having been told by new manager Gary Smith that he was not part of Smith's future plans. On leaving Stevenage, he stated — "I have had an absolutely unbelievable time with the club and I couldn't have wished to have spent seven years anywhere else. I just feel that now is my time to move on". He made 328 appearances during his first spell with the club.

Luton Town
Henry joined Conference Premier club Luton Town on a free transfer on 16 June 2012, signing a two-year contract. He was named as club captain for the 2012–13 season. Henry made his Luton debut in the club's opening day 2–2 draw against Gateshead at Kenilworth Road on 11 August 2012, playing the whole match. He played in 43 games during the 2012–13 season, but missed the last part of the season due to a double hernia. Henry underwent an operation in April 2013 in order to be fit for pre-season training before the 2013–14 season. He later stated he had been carrying the injury for a large part of the season, which inhibited his ability to attack up the right wing as often as he did at Stevenage. New Luton manager John Still retained Henry as club captain for the 2013–14 season. Henry captained Luton to the Conference Premier title, and was part of a defence that kept a club-record 23 clean sheets.

Return to Stevenage
Shortly after helping Luton earn promotion back into the Football League, Henry rejected the offer a new two-year contract there and opted to rejoin his former club Stevenage on 30 June 2014. The move reunited him with manager Graham Westley, who had also returned to the Hertfordshire club a year earlier. Henry made his first appearance back at Stevenage three weeks into the 2014–15 season, on 30 August 2014, playing the whole match in a 3–2 away victory at AFC Wimbledon, the club's first away win of the campaign. He played 38 games that season as Stevenage made the League Two play-offs, losing at the semi-final stage. Henry made 34 appearances under managers Teddy Sheringham and Darren Sarll during the 2015–16 season. During the 2016–17 season, he played 38 times as Stevenage finished three points away from the League Two play-off places.

Henry became Stevenage's all-time record appearance holder on 13 January 2018; his appearance in the club's 1–1 away draw with Morecambe was his 469th for the club, surpassing the previous record held by Mark Smith. He signed a one-year contract extension with the club on 23 April 2018, also taking on a coaching role in the club's academy as part of the new agreement. He made 45 appearances during the 2017–18 season. Henry was used sparingly during the 2018–19 season, making 19 appearances. That season, he made his 500th appearance for Stevenage in the club's 2–0 victory over Swindon Town at Broadhall Way on 12 March 2019, coming on as an 85th-minute substitute in the match. Henry was honoured with a testimonial match at the end of the season with his career at Stevenage lasting nearly 15 years. The match took place on 6 May 2019, the teams being the Stevenage 2009–10 Conference Premier winning team and a 'Ronnie Henry All-Star XI', which included players who had played alongside Henry throughout his career. Henry left Stevenage in a playing capacity on 24 May 2019. He made 502 appearances across his two spells with Stevenage, making him the club's all-time record appearance holder. Henry was appointed Youth Development Phase Coach of Stevenage's academy on 5 July 2019.

Billericay Town
Following his departure from Stevenage, Henry signed for National League South (sixth tier) club Billericay Town on 11 June 2019. Henry made his Billericay debut on the opening day of the 2019–20 season, playing the whole match in a 1–0 home victory over Eastbourne Borough on 3 August 2019. He was named 'Man of the Match' for his performance. Henry made 35 appearances during the season, which was curtailed in March 2020 due to the COVID-19 pandemic. Having played nine times for Billericay during the opening three months of the 2020–21 season, the National League South season was curtailed due to restrictions associated with the COVID-19 pandemic in February 2021. He left Billericay upon the conclusion of his contract at the end of the season.

Royston Town
After leaving Billericay, Henry joined Southern Premier Central (seventh tier) club Royston Town on 21 May 2021. Similarly to his time at Billericay Town, Henry combined his playing role at Royston alongside coaching the under-18 and under-23 teams at Stevenage.

International career
Henry was named in the England C team, who represent England at non-League level, in January 2006, for a friendly against Italy, playing the whole match in a 3–1 victory. After earning another cap in a win over Scotland C, Henry went on to captain the England C team in a 2–0 victory over Finland C. He retained his captaincy in a 2–1 win against a Wales team consisting of players under of the age of 23.

Style of play
Henry started his career as a centre-back. He was later deployed at right-back, where he has been used for the majority of his career. Towards the end of his second spell at Stevenage, and at Billericay Town, Henry was once again used in central defence. He is known for his leadership qualities; having been named club captain during both spells at Stevenage, as well as during his time at Luton and Billericay.

Career statistics

Honours
Stevenage
 FA Trophy: 2006–07, 2008–09; runner-up: 2009–10
 Conference Premier: 2009–10
 League Two play-offs: 2010–11

Luton Town
Conference Premier: 2013–14

Individual
 Stevenage Player of the Year: 2006–07
 Conference Premier Team of the Year: 2009–10

References

External links

1984 births
Association football defenders
Dublin City F.C. players
England semi-pro international footballers
English footballers
Footballers from Hertfordshire
Sportspeople from Hemel Hempstead
League of Ireland players
Living people
Tottenham Hotspur F.C. players
Luton Town F.C. players
Southend United F.C. players
Stevenage F.C. players
Billericay Town F.C. players
Royston Town F.C. players
National League (English football) players
English Football League players